Hunte is a  long river in north-western Germany (Lower Saxony), a left tributary of the Weser.

The Hunte rises in the Wiehen Hills. In the North German Plain it flows through lake Dümmer.  It flows generally northwards through the towns Bad Essen, Diepholz, Wildeshausen and Oldenburg.  It flows into the Weser in Elsfleth. The part between Oldenburg and the Weser is navigable for coastal cargo ships.  The Küsten Canal, suitable for inland navigation only, links the Hunte in Oldenburg to river Ems near Papenburg.

Catchment 
The highest point of the catchment area is the Nonnenstein in the Wiehen Hills, the lowest regions of the catchment lie within the marshes on the lower Hunte (partly below sea level). 
By far the largest part of the catchment lies on the North German Plain, so that the Hunte flows mainly through bogs, geest and marshland. A small portion lies within the Central Uplands.

See also 
List of rivers of Lower Saxony

References 

 
Rivers of Lower Saxony
Federal waterways in Germany
Rivers of Germany